The 1963 Pittsburgh Steelers season was the team's 31st in the National Football League (NFL). The Steelers won seven games, lost four, and tied three to finish fourth in the Eastern Conference. It was also their final season of splitting home games between Forbes Field and Pitt Stadium before moving all of their home games to the latter for the next six seasons.

In the second game of the season, the Steelers shut out the New York Giants 31–0 in the home opener at Pitt Stadium. The Giants had won the conference title the previous two seasons and four of the last five, but were without hall of fame quarterback Y. A. Tittle.

Because tie games were not included in NFL standings at the time (for winning percentage), the Steelers had a chance to win the conference title and advance to their first-ever NFL Championship Game. They needed to defeat the Giants at Yankee Stadium in the season finale, but lost 33–17 and fell to fourth; it was their last winning season until 1972.

This year marked the debut of the Steelers' trademark black helmets with their logo on one side of the helmet. They had used the logo previously on yellow helmets, but 1963 was the first season in which their now-signature look was used full-time in the regular season.

Prior to the season in May, defensive tackle Big Daddy Lipscomb died of an overdose of heroin at age 31; his final game was the Pro Bowl in January 1963, in which he was named the lineman of the game.

Regular season

Schedule

Game summaries

Week 1 (Sunday September 15, 1963): Philadelphia Eagles 

at Franklin Field, Philadelphia, Pennsylvania

 Game time: 
 Game weather: 
 Game attendance: 58,205
 Referee: Bill Downes
 TV announcers:

Scoring Drives:

 Philadelphia – McDonald 13 pass from Jurgensen (Clark kick)
 Pittsburgh – FG Michaels 38
 Pittsburgh – FG Michaels 50
 Philadelphia – Smith 6 pass from Jurgensen (Clark kick)
 Pittsburgh – FG Michaels 17
 Pittsburgh – Johnson 1 run (kick failed)
 Philadelphia – McDonald 75 pass from Jurgensen (Clark kick)
 Pittsburgh – Johnson 11 pass from Brown (kick failed)

Week 2 (Sunday September 22, 1963): New York Giants  

at Pitt Stadium, Pittsburgh, Pennsylvania

 Game time: 
 Game weather: 
 Game attendance: 46,068
 Referee: 
 TV announcers:

Scoring Drives:

 Pittsburgh – Hoak 1 run (Michaels kick)
 Pittsburgh – FG Michaels 11
 Pittsburgh – Hoak 2 pass from Brown (Michaels kick)
 Pittsburgh – Johnson 1 run (Michaels kick)
 Pittsburgh – Dial 46 pass from Brown (Michaels kick)

Week 3 (Sunday September 29, 1963): St. Louis Cardinals  

at Forbes Field, Pittsburgh, Pennsylvania

 Game time: 
 Game weather: 
 Game attendance: 28,225
 Referee: 
 TV announcers:

Scoring Drives:

 St. Louis – Triplett 63 run (Bakken kick)
 Pittsburgh – FG Michaels 21
 Pittsburgh – FG Michaels 40
 St. Louis – FG Bakken 28
 Pittsburgh – Hoak 1 run (Michaels kick)
 Pittsburgh – FG Michaels 21
 Pittsburgh – Ferguson 4 run (Michaels kick)

Week 4 (Saturday October 5, 1963): Cleveland Browns  

at Cleveland Municipal Stadium, Cleveland, Ohio

 Game time: 
 Game weather: 
 Game attendance: 84,684
 Referee: 
 TV announcers:

Scoring Drives:

 Pittsburgh – FG Michaels 18
 Cleveland – Brown 8 run (Groza kick)
 Pittsburgh – FG Michaels 8
 Pittsburgh – Dial 24 pass from Brown (Michaels kick)
 Cleveland – Collins 15 pass from Ryan (Groza kick)
 Pittsburgh – Dial 41 pass from Brown (Michaels kick)
 Cleveland – Ryan 13 run (Groza kick)
 Pittsburgh – FG Michaels 8
 Cleveland – Collins 20 pass from Ryan (Groza kick)
 Cleveland – Krietling 19 pass from Ryan (Groza kick)

Week 5 (Sunday October 13, 1963): St. Louis Cardinals  

at Busch Stadium, St. Louis, Missouri

 Game time: 
 Game weather: 
 Game attendance: 23,715
 Referee: 
 TV announcers:

Scoring Drives:

 St. Louis – FG Bakken 44
 Pittsburgh – FG Michaels 45
 Pittsburgh – Mack 83 pass from Brown (Michaels kick)
 Pittsburgh – FG Michaels 47
 Pittsburgh – Brown 1 run (Michaels kick)

Week 6 (Sunday October 20, 1963): Washington Redskins  

at Pitt Stadium, Pittsburgh, Pennsylvania

 Game time: 
 Game weather: 
 Game attendance: 41,987
 Referee: 
 TV announcers:
 Pittsburgh – Brown 1 run (Michaels kick)
 Washington – FG Khayat 49
 Pittsburgh – Hoak 8 run (Michaels kick)
 Pittsburgh – FG Michaels 9
 Washington – Snead 1 run (Khayat kick)
 Washington – James 36 pass from Snead (Khayat kick)
 Washington – James 5 run (Khayat kick)
 Pittsburgh – Hoak 1 run (Michaels kick)
 Washington – FG Khayat 15
 Pittsburgh – Haley 24 interception return (Michaels kick)
 Pittsburgh – Dial 4 pass from Brown (Michaels kick)

Week 7 (Sunday October 27, 1963): Dallas Cowboys  

at Forbes Field, Pittsburgh, Pennsylvania

 Game time: 
 Game weather: 
 Game attendance: 19,047
 Referee: 
 TV announcers:

Scoring Drives:

 Dallas – Clarke 5 pass from Meredith (Baker kick)
 Dallas – Folkins 35 pass from Meredith (Baker kick)
 Pittsburgh – Dial 83 pass from Browns (kick failed)
 Dallas – Howton 13 pass from Meredith (Baker kick)
 Pittsburgh – Dial 25 pass from Brown (Tracy kick)
 Pittsburgh – Dial 14 pass from Brown (Tracy kick)
 Pittsburgh – Mack 85 pass from Brown (Michaels kick)

Week 8 (Sunday November 3, 1963): Green Bay Packers  

at Milwaukee County Stadium, Milwaukee, Wisconsin

 Game time: 
 Game weather: 
 Game attendance: 
 Referee: 
 TV announcers:

Scoring Drives:

 Pittsburgh – Hoak 2 run (Michaels kick)
 Green Bay – FG Kramer 23
 Green Bay – FG Kramer 36
 Green Bay – FG Kramer 12
 Green Bay – Taylor 1 run (Kramer kick)
 Green Bay – Pitts 2 run (Kramer kick)
 Green Bay – FG Kramer 37
 Pittsburgh – Mack 33 pass from Brown (Michaels kick)
 Green Bay – Pitts 1 run (Kramer kick)

Week 9 (Sunday November 10, 1963): Cleveland Browns  

at Pitt Stadium, Pittsburgh, Pennsylvania

 Game time: 
 Game weather: 
 Game attendance: 54,497
 Referee: 
 TV announcers:

Scoring Drives:

 Cleveland – Collins 4 pass from Ryan (Groza kick)
 Pittsburgh – Safety, Brown tackled by Schmitz in end zone
 Pittsburgh – Ballman 9 pass from Brown (Michaels kick)

Week 10 (Sunday November 17, 1963): Washington Redskins  

at D.C. Stadium, Washington, DC

 Game time: 
 Game weather: 
 Game attendance: 42,219
 Referee: 
 TV announcers:

Scoring Drives:

 Washington – Crabb 53 interception return (Khayat kick)
 Pittsburgh – Johnson 3 run (Michaels kick)
 Washington – Mitchell 19 pass from Snead (Khayat kick)
 Pittsburgh – Ballman 67 pass from Brown (Khayat kick)
 Pittsburgh – Johnson 1 run (Michaels kick)
 Pittsburgh – FG Michaels 27
 Washington – Mitchell 20 pass from Barnes (Khayat kick)
 Pittsburgh – FG Michaels 18
 Washington – Richter 21 pass from Snead (Khayat kick)
 Pittsburgh – Ballman 92 kickoff return (Michaels kick)

Week 11 (Sunday November 24, 1963): Chicago Bears  

at Forbes Field, Pittsburgh, Pennsylvania

 Game time: 
 Game weather: 
 Game attendance: 36,465
 Referee: 
 TV announcers:

Scoring Drives:

 Chicago – Galimore 1 run (Jencks kick)
 Pittsburgh – Hoak 6 run (Michaels kick)
 Chicago – Bull 1 run (Jencks kick)
 Pittsburgh – Curry 31 pass from Brown (Michaels kick)
 Pittsburgh – FG Michaels 11
 Chicago – FG Leclerc 18

Week 12 (Sunday December 1, 1963): Philadelphia Eagles  

at Forbes Field, Pittsburgh, Pennsylvania

 Game time: 
 Game weather: 
 Game attendance: 15,721
 Referee: 
 TV announcers:

Scoring Drives:

 Pittsburgh – FG Michaels 10
 Philadelphia – Retzlaff 24 pass from Hill (Clark kick)
 Philadelphia – Brown 14 run (Clark kick)
 Philadelphia – FG Clark 23
 Pittsburgh – Ballman 57 pass from Brown (Michaels kick)
 Philadelphia – FG Clark 40
 Pittsburgh – Ballman 8 pass from Brown (Michaels kick)
 Pittsburgh – FG Michaels 24

Week 13 (Sunday December 8, 1963): Dallas Cowboys  

at Cotton Bowl, Dallas, Texas

 Game time: 
 Game weather: 
 Game attendance: 24,136
 Referee: 
 TV announcers:

Scoring Drives:

 Dallas – FG Baker 53
 Dallas – Meredith 2 run (kick failed)
 Pittsburgh – Dial 55 pass from Brown (Michaels kick)
 Pittsburgh – Carpenter 28 pass from Brown (Michaels kick)
 Pittsburgh – FG Michaels 24
 Dallas – FG Baker 46
 Dallas – Meredith 4 run (Baker kick)
 Pittsburgh – Sapp 24 run (Michaels kick)

Week 14 (December 15, 1963): New York Giants  

at Yankee Stadium, The Bronx, New York

 Game time: 
 Game weather: 
 Game attendance: 63,240
 Referee: 
 TV announcers:

Scoring Drives:

 New York Giants – FG Chandler 34
 New York Giants – Shotner 41 pass from Tittle (kick failed)
 New York Giants – Morrison 3 pass from Tittle (Chandler kick)
 Pittsburgh – FG Michaels 27
 Pittsburgh – Ballman 21 pass from Brown (Michaels kick)
 New York Giants – Morrison 22 pass from Tittle (Chandler kick)
 New York Giants – Morrison 1 run (Chandler kick)
 Pittsburgh – Dial 40 pass from Brown (Michaels kick)
 New York Giants – FG Chandler 41

Standings

References

External links
 1963 Pittsburgh Steelers season at Profootballreference.com 
 1963 Pittsburgh Steelers season statistics at jt-sw.com 

Pittsburgh Steelers seasons
Pittsburgh Steelers
Pittsburgh Steel